Pentastar Aviation is an American aviation services company based in Waterford, Oakland County, Michigan. It provides domestic and international private charter flights, avionics, maintenance services, in-flight catering and FBO services.  Originally a subsidiary of the Chrysler Corporation, the company was sold in 2001 to Ford family member Edsel B. Ford II.

History
Pentastar Aviation began in 1964 as Chrysler Air Transportation, Chrysler Corporation's internal flight department based at Willow Run Airport in Ypsilanti, Michigan.  The company was renamed Pentastar Aviation in 1980.  Initially providing internal flight services, over time the division expanded to offer maintenance and avionics services, private aircraft brokerage services, fixed-base operation services and charter services through Pentastar Aviation Charter, Inc.

Fleet
Pentastar Aviation Charter, Inc's fleet includes the following aircraft:

 King Air 200
 Citation Jet Series
 Hawker 400XP
 Learjet 45 / 75
 Embraer Phenom 300
 Citation XL/XLS
 Hawker 800XP
 Hawker 850XP
 Hawker 900XP
 Learjet 60 / 60XR
 Gulfstream 150
 Citation Latitude
 Challenger 300/350
 Citation X / Sovereign
 Falcon 50EX
 Gulfstream 200 / 280
 Legacy 450 / 500
 Challenger 604 / 605
 Falcon 2000 EX / LXS
 Gulfstream IV / IVSP / 450 / 400
 Embraer Legacy 600
 Dassault Falcon 7X
 Gulfstream V / 550 / 650
 Bombardier Global Express

The company also uses a range of jets through a network of pre-approved operators.

Aircraft maintenance
Pentastar Aviation holds Class 3 and Class 4 airframe ratings and maintains Gulfstream, Bombardier, Cessna, Dassault and Hawker aircraft. It also carries out avionics installation and repair at its facility at Oakland County International Airport.

On March 13, 2012, Key Air, the leading FBO service provider and aircraft management and charter provider at the Waterbury-Oxford Airport in Oxford, CT, officially announced that they would be signing a memorandum of understanding with Pentastar Aviation. This agreement allowed Pentastar to operate on the east coast of the United States in addition to their headquarters in Oakland County International Airport. The facilities were officially opened on June 13, 2012.

Scheduled airline service
Twice Pentastar has operated scheduled airline service under a public charter arrangement.

The first was in 2013 and 2014 when they operated Saab SF340 aircraft on behalf of "Lakeshore Express" between Pontiac, Midway International Airport, and Pellston Regional Airport.

The second was for a startup, OneJet, operating Hawker Beechjet 400A aircraft out of an Indianapolis International Airport base to a number of destinations in the Midwest. This flying will transition to Corporate Flight Management in June 2016.

Notes

Aviation organizations based in the United States
Airport operators of the United States
Charter airlines of the United States
Companies based in Michigan
Airlines based in Michigan